Vernetti is a surname. Notable people with the surname include:

Gianni Vernetti (born 1960), Italian politician
Guillermo Vernetti (born 1993), Argentine professional footballer